Zhang Zhannan (born 1948) is a retired vice-admiral (zhong jiang) of the People's Liberation Army Navy (PLAN) of China. He served as Deputy Commander of the PLAN, Commander of the North Sea Fleet, and President of Dalian Naval Academy.

Biography
Zhang Zhannan was born in 1948 in Huarong County, Hunan Province, and enlisted in the PLAN in 1968. He studied at Dalian Naval Academy, PLA Naval Command Academy, and PLA National Defence University.

Zhang served as chief of staff of the Zhoushan Naval Base from 1994 to 1996, and deputy commander from 1996 to 1997. He was appointed president of Dalian Naval Academy in October 1997, and attained the rank of rear admiral in July 1998.

Zhang became deputy chief of staff of the PLAN in July 2000. In June 2003, he was promoted to commander of the North Sea Fleet, and concurrently deputy commander of the Jinan Military Region. He was awarded the rank of vice-admiral a year later. In May 2006, he was appointed deputy commander of the PLAN. He retired from active service in July 2011.

References

1948 births
Living people
People's Liberation Army generals from Hunan
People from Yueyang
Dalian Naval Academy alumni
PLA National Defence University alumni
Commanders of the North Sea Fleet